Gunnar Mykstu (7 January 1909 – 18 November 1974) was a Norwegian politician for the Labour Party.

He was elected to the Norwegian Parliament from Buskerud in 1958, and was re-elected on one occasion. He had previously served as a deputy representative in the periods 1950–1953 and 1954–1957.

Mykstu was born in Rollag and was involved in local politics in Rollag municipality between 1934–1940 and 1947–1955.

References

1909 births
1974 deaths
Labour Party (Norway) politicians
Members of the Storting
20th-century Norwegian politicians
People from Rollag